Sagitovo (Säğit) is a rural locality (a village) in Krasnokurtovsky Selsoviet, Arkhangelsky District, Bashkortostan, Russia. The population was 55 as of 2010. There is 1 street.

Geography 
Sagitovo is located 25 km north of Arkhangelskoye (the district's administrative centre) by road. Tukmakly is the nearest rural locality.

References 

Rural localities in Arkhangelsky District